The Manchus are a Tungusic East Asian ethnic group native to Manchuria in Northeast Asia. They are an officially recognized ethnic minority in China and the people from whom Manchuria derives its name. The Later Jin (1616–1636) and Qing (1636–1912) dynasties of China were established and ruled by the Manchus, who are descended from the Jurchen people who earlier established the Jin dynasty (1115–1234) in northern China.
Manchus form the largest branch of the Tungusic peoples and are distributed throughout China, forming the fourth largest ethnic group in the country. They can be found in 31 Chinese provincial regions. Among them, Liaoning has the largest population and Hebei, Heilongjiang, Jilin, Inner Mongolia and Beijing have over 100,000 Manchu residents. About half of the population live in Liaoning and one-fifth in Hebei. There are a number of Manchu autonomous counties in China, such as Xinbin, Xiuyan, Qinglong, Fengning, Yitong, Qingyuan, Weichang, Kuancheng, Benxi, Kuandian, Huanren, Fengcheng, Beizhen and over 300 Manchu towns and townships. Manchus are the largest minority group in China without an autonomous region.

Name
"Manchu" was adopted as the official name of the people by Emperor Hong Taiji in 1635, replacing the earlier name "Jurchen". It appears that manju was an old term for the Jianzhou Jurchens, although the etymology is not well understood.

The Jiu Manzhou Dang, archives of early 17th century documents, contains the earliest use of Manchu. However, the actual etymology of the ethnic name "Manju" is debatable. According to the Qing dynasty's official historical record, the Researches on Manchu Origins, the ethnic name came from Mañjuśrī. The Qianlong Emperor also supported the point of view and even wrote several poems on the subject.

Meng Sen, a scholar of the Qing dynasty, agreed. On the other hand, he thought the name Manchu might stem from Li Manzhu, the chieftain of the Jianzhou Jurchens.

Another scholar, Chang Shan, thinks Manju is a compound word. Man was from the word mangga which means "strong," and ju means "arrow." So Manju actually means "intrepid arrow".

There are other hypotheses, such as Fu Sinian's "etymology of Jianzhou"; Zhang Binglin's "etymology of Manshi"; Isamura Sanjiro's "etymology of Wuji and Mohe"; Sun Wenliang's "etymology of Manzhe"; "etymology of mangu(n) river" and so on.

An extensive etymological study from 2022 lends additional support to the view that manju is cognate with words referring to the lower Amur river in other Tungusic languages and can be reconstructed to Proto-Tungusic *mamgo 'lower Amur, large river'.

History

Origins and early history 

The Manchus are descended from the Jurchen people who earlier established the Jin dynasty (1115–1234) in China. The name Mohe might refer to an ancestral population of the Manchus. The Mohe practiced pig farming extensively and were mainly sedentary, and also used both pig and dog skins for coats. They were predominantly farmers and grew soybeans, wheat, millet and rice, in addition to hunting.

In the 10th century AD, the term Jurchen first appeared in documents of the late Tang dynasty in reference to the state of Balhae in present-day northeastern China. The Jurchens were sedentary, settled farmers with advanced agriculture. They farmed grain and millet as their cereal crops, grew flax, and raised oxen, pigs, sheep and horses. Their farming way of life was very different from the pastoral nomadism of the Mongols and the Khitans on the steppes. Most Jurchens raised pigs and stock animals and were farmers.

In 1019, Jurchen pirates raided Japan for slaves. The Jurchen pirates slaughtered Japanese men while seizing Japanese women as prisoners in northern Kyushu. Fujiwara Notada, the Japanese governor was killed. In total, 1,280 Japanese were taken prisoner, 374 Japanese were killed and 380 Japanese-owned livestock were killed for food. Only 259 or 270 were returned by Koreans from the 8 ships. The woman Uchikura no Ishime's report was copied down. Traumatic memories of the Jurchen raids on Japan in the 1019 Toi invasion, the Mongol invasions of Japan in addition to Japan viewing the Jurchens as "Tatar" "barbarians" after copying China's barbarian-civilized distinction, may have played a role in Japan's antagonistic views against Manchus and hostility towards them in later centuries such as when Tokugawa Ieyasu viewed the unification of Manchu tribes as a threat to Japan. The Japanese mistakenly thought that Hokkaido (Ezochi) had a land bridge to Tartary (Orankai) where Manchus lived and thought the Manchus could invade Japan. The Tokugawa Shogunate bakufu sent a message to Korea via Tsushima offering help to Korea against the 1627 Manchu invasion of Korea. Korea refused it.

Following the fall of Balhae, the Jurchens became vassals of the Khitan-led Liao dynasty. The Jurchens in the Yalu River region were tributaries of Goryeo since the reign of Wang Geon, who called upon them during the wars of the Later Three Kingdoms period, but the Jurchens switched allegiance between Liao and Goryeo multiple times, taking advantage of the tension between the two nations; posing a potential threat to Goryeo's border security, the Jurchens offered tribute to the Goryeo court, expecting lavish gifts in return. Before the Jurchens overthrew the Khitan, married Jurchen women and Jurchen girls were raped by Liao Khitan envoys as a custom which caused resentment. Khitan envoys among the Jurchens were treated to guest prostitutes by their Jurchen hosts. Unmarried Jurchen girls and their families hosted the Liao envoys who had sex with the girls. Song envoys among the Jin were similarly entertained by singing girls in Guide, Henan.  The practice of guest prostitution – giving female companions, food and shelter to guests – was common among Jurchens. Unmarried daughters of Jurchen families of lower and middle classes in Jurchen villages were provided to Khitan messengers for sex as recorded by Hong Hao. There is no evidence that guest prostitution of unmarried Jurchen girls to Khitans was resented by the Jurchens. It was only when the aristocratic Jurchen families were forced to give up their beautiful wives as guest prostitutes to Khitan messengers that the Jurchens became angered. This probably meant only a husband had the right to his married wife while among lower class Jurchens, the virginity of unmarried girls and sex did not impede their ability to marry later. The Jurchens and their Manchu descendants had Khitan linguistic and grammatical elements in their personal names like suffixes. Many Khitan names had a "ju" suffix. In the year 1114, Wanyan Aguda united the Jurchen tribes and established the Jin dynasty (1115–1234). His brother and successor, Wanyan Wuqimai defeated the Liao dynasty. After the fall of the Liao dynasty, the Jurchens went to war with the Northern Song dynasty, and captured most of northern China in the Jin–Song wars. During the Jin dynasty, the first Jurchen script came into use in the 1120s. It was mainly derived from the Khitan script. Poor Jurchen families in the southern Routes (Daming and Shandong) Battalion and Company households tried to live the lifestyle of wealthy Jurchen families and avoid doing farming work by selling their own Jurchen daughters into slavery and renting their land to Han tenants. The Wealthy Jurchens feasted and drank and wore damask and silk. The History of Jin (Jinshi) says that Emperor Shizong of Jin took note and attempted to halt these things in 1181.

In 1206, the Mongols, vassals to the Jurchens, rose in Mongolia. Their leader, Genghis Khan, led Mongol troops against the Jurchens, who were finally defeated by Ögedei Khan in 1234. The Jurchen Jin emperor Wanyan Yongji's daughter, Jurchen Princess Qiguo was married to Mongol leader Genghis Khan in exchange for relieving the Mongol siege upon Zhongdu (Beijing) in the Mongol conquest of the Jin dynasty. Under the Mongols' control, the Jurchens were divided into two groups and treated differently: the ones who were born and raised in North China and fluent in Chinese were considered to be Chinese (Han), but the people who were born and raised in the Jurchen homeland (Manchuria) without Chinese-speaking abilities were treated as Mongols politically. From that time, the Jurchens of North China increasingly merged with the Han Chinese while those living in their homeland started to be Mongolized. They adopted Mongolian customs, names, and the Mongolian language. As time went on, fewer and fewer Jurchens could recognize their own script.

The Mongol-led Yuan dynasty was replaced by the Ming dynasty in 1368. In 1387, Ming forces defeated the Mongol commander Naghachu's resisting forces who settled in the Haixi area and began to summon the Jurchen tribes to pay tribute. At the time, some Jurchen clans were vassals to the Joseon dynasty of Korea such as Odoli and Huligai. Their elites served in the Korean royal bodyguard.

The Joseon Koreans tried to deal with the military threat posed by the Jurchen by using both forceful means and incentives, and by launching military attacks. At the same time they tried to appease them with titles and degrees, traded with them, and sought to acculturate them by having Jurchens integrate into Korean culture. Despite these measures, however, fighting continued between the Jurchen and the Koreans. Their relationship was eventually stopped by the Ming dynasty government who wanted the Jurchens to protect the border. In 1403, Ahacu, chieftain of Huligai, paid tribute to the Yongle Emperor of the Ming dynasty. Soon after that, Möngke Temür, chieftain of the Odoli clan of the Jianzhou Jurchens, defected from paying tribute to Korea, becoming a tributary state to China instead. Yi Seong-gye, the Taejo of Joseon, asked the Ming Empire to send Möngke Temür back but was refused. The Yongle Emperor was determined to wrest the Jurchens out of Korean influence and have China dominate them instead. Korea tried to persuade Möngke Temür to reject the Ming overtures, but was unsuccessful, and Möngke Temür submitted to the Ming Empire. Since then, more and more Jurchen tribes presented tribute to the Ming Empire in succession. The Ming divided them into 384 guards, and the Jurchen became vassals to the Ming Empire. During the Ming dynasty, the name for the Jurchen land was Nurgan. The Jurchens became part of the Ming dynasty's Nurgan Regional Military Commission under the Yongle Emperor, with Ming forces erecting the Yongning Temple Stele in 1413, at the headquarters of Nurgan. The stele was inscribed in Chinese, Jurchen, Mongolian, and Tibetan. Yishiha, who was a Jurchen eunuch slave in the Ming imperial palace after he was captured and castrated as a boy by Ming Chinese forces, was the one who led the Ming expedition into Nurgan to erect the stele and established the Nurgan Regional Military Commission.

In 1449, Mongol taishi Esen attacked the Ming Empire and captured the Zhengtong Emperor in Tumu. Some Jurchen guards in Jianzhou and Haixi cooperated with Esen's action, but more were attacked in the Mongol invasion. Many Jurchen chieftains lost their hereditary certificates granted by the Ming government. They had to present tribute as secretariats with less reward from the Ming court than in the time when they were heads of guards – an unpopular development. Subsequently, more and more Jurchens recognised the Ming Empire's declining power due to Esen's invasion. The Zhengtong Emperor's capture directly caused Jurchen guards to go out of control. Tribal leaders, such as Cungšan and Wang Gao, brazenly plundered Ming territory. At about this time, the Jurchen script was officially abandoned. More Jurchens adopted Mongolian as their writing language and fewer used Chinese. The final recorded Jurchen writing dates to 1526.

The Manchus are sometimes mistakenly identified as nomadic people. The Manchu way of life (economy) was agricultural, farming crops and raising animals on farms. Manchus practiced slash-and-burn agriculture in the areas north of Shenyang. The Haixi Jurchens were "semi-agricultural, the Jianzhou Jurchens and Maolian Jurchens were sedentary, while hunting and fishing was the way of life of the "Wild Jurchens". Han Chinese society resembled that of the sedentary Jianzhou and Maolian, who were farmers. Hunting, archery on horseback, horsemanship, livestock raising, and sedentary agriculture were all part of the Jianzhou Jurchens' culture. Although Manchus practiced equestrianism and archery on horseback, their immediate progenitors practiced sedentary agriculture. The Manchus also partook in hunting but were sedentary. Their primary mode of production was farming while they lived in villages, forts, and walled towns. Their Jurchen Jin predecessors also practiced farming.

Only the Mongols and the northern "wild" Jurchen were semi-nomadic, unlike the mainstream Jiahnzhou Jurchens descended from the Jin dynasty who were farmers that foraged, hunted, herded and harvested crops in the Liao and Yalu river basins. They gathered ginseng root, pine nuts, hunted for came pels in the uplands and forests, raised horses in their stables, and farmed millet and wheat in their fallow fields. They engaged in dances, wrestling and drinking strong liquor as noted during midwinter by the Korean Sin Chung-il when it was very cold. These Jurchens who lived in the north-east's harsh cold climate sometimes half sunk their houses in the ground which they constructed of brick or timber and surrounded their fortified villages with stone foundations on which they built wattle and mud walls to defend against attack. Village clusters were ruled by beile, hereditary leaders. They fought each other's and dispensed weapons, wives, slaves and lands to their followers in them. This was how the Jurchens who founded the Qing lived and how their ancestors lived before the Jin. Alongside Mongols and Jurchen clans there were migrants from Liaodong provinces of Ming China and Korea living among these Jurchens in a cosmopolitan manner. Nurhaci who was hosting Sin Chung-il was uniting all of them into his own army, having them adopt the Jurchen hairstyle of a long queue and a shaved fore=crown and wearing leather tunics. His armies had black, blue, red, white and yellow flags. These became the Eight Banners, initially capped to 4 then growing to 8 with three different types of ethnic banners as Han, Mongol and Jurchen were recruited into Nurhaci's forces. Jurchens like Nurhaci spoke both their native Tungusic language and Chinese, adopting the Mongol script for their own language unlike the Jin Jurchen's Khitan derived script. They adopted Confucian values and practiced their shamanist traditions.

The Qing stationed the "New Manchu" Warka foragers in Ningguta and attempted to turn them into normal agricultural farmers but then the Warka just reverted to hunter gathering and requested money to buy cattle for beef broth. The Qing wanted the Warka to become soldier-farmers and imposed this on them but the Warka simply left their garrison at Ningguta and went back to the Sungari river to their homes to herd, fish and hunt. The Qing accused them of desertion.

Although their Mohe ancestors did not respect dogs, the Jurchens began to respect dogs around the time of the Ming dynasty, and passed this tradition on to the Manchus. It was prohibited in Jurchen culture to use dog skin, and forbidden for Jurchens to harm, kill, or eat dogs. For political reasons, the Jurchen leader Nurhaci chose variously to emphasize either differences or similarities in lifestyles with other peoples like the Mongols. Nurhaci said to the Mongols that "the languages of the Chinese and Koreans are different, but their clothing and way of life is the same. It is the same with us Manchus (Jušen) and Mongols. Our languages are different, but our clothing and way of life is the same." Later Nurhaci indicated that the bond with the Mongols was not based in any real shared culture. It was for pragmatic reasons of "mutual opportunism," since Nurhaci said to the Mongols: "You Mongols raise livestock, eat meat, and wear pelts. My people till the fields and live on grain. We two are not one country and we have different languages."

Manchu rule over China 

A century after the chaos started in the Jurchen lands, Nurhaci, a chieftain of the Jianzhou Left Guard, began a campaign against the Ming Empire in revenge for their manslaughter of his grandfather and father in 1583. He reunified the Jurchen tribes, established a military system called the "Eight Banners", which organized Jurchen soldiers into groups of "Bannermen", and ordered his scholar Erdeni and minister Gagai to create a new Jurchen script (later known as Manchu script) using the traditional Mongolian alphabet as a reference.

When the Jurchens were reorganized by Nurhaci into the Eight Banners, many Manchu clans were artificially created as a group of unrelated people founded a new Manchu clan (mukun) using a geographic origin name such as a toponym for their hala (clan name). The irregularities over Jurchen and Manchu clan origin led to the Qing trying to document and systematize the creation of histories for Manchu clans, including manufacturing an entire legend around the origin of the Aisin-Gioro clan by taking mythology from the northeast.

In 1603, Nurhaci gained recognition as the Sure Kundulen Khan ("wise and respected khan") from his Khalkha Mongol allies; then, in 1616, he publicly enthroned himself and issued a proclamation naming himself Genggiyen Khan ("bright khan") of the Later Jin dynasty (後金). Nurhaci then launched his attack on the Ming dynasty and moved the capital to Mukden after his conquest of Liaodong. In 1635, his son and successor Huangtaiji changed the name of the Jurchen ethnic group to the Manchu. A year later, Huangtaiji proclaimed himself the emperor of the Qing dynasty. Factors for the change of name of these people from Jurchen to Manchu include the fact that the term "Jurchen" had negative connotations since the Jurchens had been in a servile position to the Ming dynasty for several hundred years, and it also referred to people of the "dependent class".

In 1644, the Ming capital, Beijing, was sacked by a peasant revolt led by Li Zicheng, a former minor Ming official who became the leader of the peasant revolt, who then proclaimed the establishment of the Shun dynasty. The last Ming ruler, the Chongzhen Emperor, died by suicide by hanging himself when the city fell. When Li Zicheng moved against the Ming general Wu Sangui, the latter made an alliance with the Manchus and opened the Shanhai Pass to the Manchu army. After the Manchus defeated Li Zicheng, they moved the capital of their new Qing Empire to Beijing in the same year.

The Qing government differentiated between Han Bannermen and ordinary Han civilians. Han Bannermen were Han Chinese who defected to the Qing Empire up to 1644 and joined the Eight Banners, giving them social and legal privileges in addition to being acculturated to Manchu culture. So many Han defected to the Qing Empire and swelled up the ranks of the Eight Banners that ethnic Manchus became a minority within the Banners, making up only 16% in 1648, with Han Bannermen dominating at 75% and Mongol Bannermen making up the rest. It was this multi-ethnic, majority Han force in which Manchus were a minority, which conquered China for the Qing Empire.

A mass marriage of Han Chinese officers and officials to Manchu women was organized to balance the massive number of Han women who entered the Manchu court as courtesans, concubines, and wives. These couples were arranged by Prince Yoto and Hong Taiji in 1632 to promote harmony between the two ethnic groups. Also to promote ethnic harmony, a 1648 decree from the Shunzhi Emperor allowed Han Chinese civilian men to marry Manchu women from the Banners with the permission of the Board of Revenue if they were registered daughters of officials or commoners or the permission of their banner company captain if they were unregistered commoners. It was only later in the dynasty that these policies allowing intermarriage were done away with.

The change of the name from Jurchen to Manchu was made to hide the fact that the ancestors of the Manchus, the Jianzhou Jurchens, had been ruled by the Chinese. The Qing dynasty carefully hid the two original editions of the books of "Qing Taizu Wu Huangdi Shilu" and the "Manzhou Shilu Tu" (Taizu Shilu Tu) in the Qing palace, forbidden from public view because they showed that the Manchu Aisin-Gioro family had been ruled by the Ming dynasty. In the Ming period, the Koreans of Joseon referred to the Jurchen inhabited lands north of the Korean peninsula, above the rivers Yalu and Tumen to be part of Ming China, as the "superior country" (sangguk) which they called Ming China. The Qing deliberately excluded references and information that showed the Jurchens (Manchus) as subservient to the Ming dynasty, from the History of Ming to hide their former subservient relationship to the Ming. The Veritable Records of Ming were not used to source content on Jurchens during Ming rule in the History of Ming because of this.

As a result of their conquest of China, almost all the Manchus followed the prince regent Dorgon and the Shunzhi Emperor to Beijing and settled there. A few of them were sent to other places such as Inner Mongolia, Xinjiang and Tibet to serve as garrison troops. There were only 1524 Bannermen left in Manchuria at the time of the initial Manchu conquest. After a series of border conflicts with the Russians, the Qing emperors started to realize the strategic importance of Manchuria and gradually sent Manchus back where they originally came from. But throughout the Qing dynasty, Beijing was the focal point of the ruling Manchus in the political, economic and cultural spheres. The Yongzheng Emperor noted: "Garrisons are the places of stationed works, Beijing is their homeland."

While the Manchu ruling elite at the Qing imperial court in Beijing and posts of authority throughout China increasingly adopted Han culture, the Qing imperial government viewed the Manchu communities (as well as those of various tribal people) in Manchuria as a place where traditional Manchu virtues could be preserved, and as a vital reservoir of military manpower fully dedicated to the regime. The Qing emperors tried to protect the traditional way of life of the Manchus (as well as various other tribal peoples) in central and northern Manchuria by a variety of means. In particular, they restricted the migration of Han settlers to the region. This had to be balanced with practical needs, such as maintaining the defense of northern China against the Russians and the Mongols, supplying government farms with a skilled work force, and conducting trade in the region's products, which resulted in a continuous trickle of Han convicts, workers, and merchants to the northeast.

Han Chinese transfrontiersmen and other non-Jurchen origin people who joined the Later Jin very early were put into the Manchu Banners and were known as "Baisin" in Manchu, and not put into the Han Banners to which later Han Chinese were placed in. An example was the Tokoro Manchu clan in the Manchu banners which claimed to be descended from a Han Chinese with the surname of Tao who had moved north from Zhejiang to Liaodong and joined the Jurchens before the Qing in the Ming Wanli emperor's era. The Han Chinese Banner Tong 佟 clan of Fushun in Liaoning falsely claimed to be related to the Jurchen Manchu Tunggiya 佟佳 clan of Jilin, using this false claim to get themselves transferred to a Manchu banner in the reign of the Kangxi emperor.

Select groups of Han Chinese bannermen were mass transferred into Manchu Banners by the Qing, changing their ethnicity from Han Chinese to Manchu. Han Chinese bannermen of Tai Nikan 台尼堪 (watchpost Chinese) and Fusi Nikan 撫順尼堪 (Fushun Chinese) backgrounds into the Manchu banners in 1740 by order of the Qing Qianlong emperor. It was between 1618 and 1629 when the Han Chinese from Liaodong who later became the Fushun Nikan and Tai Nikan defected to the Jurchens (Manchus). These Han Chinese origin Manchu clans continue to use their original Han surnames and are marked as of Han origin on Qing lists of Manchu clans. The Fushun Nikan became Manchufied and the originally Han banner families of Wang Shixuan, Cai Yurong, Zu Dashou, Li Yongfang, Shi Tingzhu and Shang Kexi intermarried extensively with Manchu families.

Manchu families adopted Han Chinese sons from families of bondservant Booi Aha (baoyi) origin and they served in Manchu company registers as detached household Manchus and the Qing imperial court found this out in 1729. Manchu Bannermen who needed money helped falsify registration for Han Chinese servants being adopted into the Manchu banners and Manchu families who lacked sons were allowed to adopt their servant's sons or servants themselves. The Manchu families were paid to adopt Han Chinese sons from bondservant families by those families. The Qing Imperial Guard captain Batu was furious at the Manchus who adopted Han Chinese as their sons from slave and bondservant families in exchange for money and expressed his displeasure at them adopting Han Chinese instead of other Manchus. These Han Chinese who infiltrated the Manchu Banners by adoption were known as "secondary-status bannermen" and "false Manchus" or "separate-register Manchus", and there were eventually so many of these Han Chinese that they took over military positions in the Banners which should have been reserved for Manchus. Han Chinese foster-son and separate register bannermen made up 800 out of 1,600 soldiers of the Mongol Banners and Manchu Banners of Hangzhou in 1740 which was nearly 50%. Han Chinese foster-son made up 220 out of 1,600 unsalaried troops at Jingzhou in 1747 and an assortment of Han Chinese separate-register, Mongol, and Manchu bannermen were the remainder. Han Chinese secondary status bannermen made up 180 of 3,600 troop households in Ningxia while Han Chinese separate registers made up 380 out of 2,700 Manchu soldiers in Liangzhou. The result of these Han Chinese fake Manchus taking up military positions resulted in many legitimate Manchus being deprived of their rightful positions as soldiers in the Banner armies, resulting in the real Manchus unable to receive their salaries as Han Chinese infiltrators in the banners stole their social and economic status and rights. These Han Chinese infiltrators were said to be good military troops and their skills at marching and archery were up to par so that the Zhapu lieutenant general couldn't differentiate them from true Manchus in terms of military skills. Manchu Banners contained a lot of "false Manchus" who were from Han Chinese civilian families but were adopted by Manchu bannermen after the Yongzheng reign. The Jingkou and Jiangning Mongol banners and Manchu Banners had 1,795 adopted Han Chinese and the Beijing Mongol Banners and Manchu Banners had 2,400 adopted Han Chinese in statistics taken from the 1821 census. Despite Qing attempts to differentiate adopted Han Chinese from normal Manchu bannermen the differences between them became hazy. These adopted Han Chinese bondservants who managed to get themselves onto Manchu banner roles were called kaihu ren (開戶人) in Chinese and dangse faksalaha urse in Manchu. Normal Manchus were called jingkini Manjusa.

A Manchu Bannerman in Guangzhou called Hequan illegally adopted a Han Chinese named Zhao Tinglu, the son of former Han bannerman Zhao Quan, and gave him a new name, Quanheng in order that he be able to benefit from his adopted son receiving a salary as a Banner soldier.

Commoner Manchu bannermen who were not nobility were called irgen which meant common, in contrast to the Manchu nobility of the "Eight Great Houses" who held noble titles.

This policy of artificially isolating the Manchus of the northeast from the rest of China could not last forever. In the 1850s, large numbers of Manchu bannermen were sent to central China to fight the Taiping rebels. (For example, just the Heilongjiang province – which at the time included only the northern part of today's Heilongjiang – contributed 67,730 bannermen to the campaign, of whom only 10–20% survived).Those few who returned were demoralized and often disposed to opium addiction. In 1860, in the aftermath of the loss of "Outer Manchuria", and with the imperial and provincial governments in deep financial trouble, parts of Manchuria became officially open to Chinese settlement; within a few decades, the Manchus became a minority in most of Manchuria's districts.

Dulimbai Gurun  is the Manchu name for China. After conquering the Ming dynasty, the Qing rulers typically referred to their state as the "Great Qing", or Daicing gurun in Manchu. In some documents, the state, or parts of it, is called "China" (Zhongguo), or "Dulimbai Gurun" in the Manchu tongue. Debate continues over whether the Qing equated the lands of the Qing state, including present-day Manchuria, Xinjiang, Mongolia, Tibet and other areas, with "China" in both the Chinese and Manchu languages. Some scholars claim that the Qing rulers defined China as a multiethnic state, rejecting the idea that China only meant Han areas, proclaiming that both Han and non-Han peoples were part of "China", using "China" to refer to the Qing dynasty's empire in official documents, international treaties, and foreign affairs, and the term "Chinese people" (Manchu:  Dulimbai gurun-i niyalma) referred to all the Han, Manchu, and Mongol subjects of the Qing Empire.

When the Qing Empire conquered Dzungaria in 1759, it proclaimed that the new land was absorbed into "China" (Dulimbai Gurun) in a Manchu-language memorial. The Qing government expounded in its ideology that it was bringing the "outer" non-Han Chinese like the Inner Mongols, Eastern Mongols, Oirat Mongols, and Tibetans together with the "inner" Han Chinese into "one family" united in the Qing state. The Qing government used the phrase "Zhongwai yijia"  or "neiwai yijia"  ("interior and exterior as one family") to convey this idea of unification of the different peoples of their empire. A Manchu-language version of a treaty with the Russian Empire concerning criminal jurisdiction over bandits called people from the Qing Empire as "people of the Central Kingdom (Dulimbai Gurun)". In the Manchu official Tulisen's Manchu language account of his meeting with the Torghut leader Ayuka Khan, it was mentioned that while the Torghuts were unlike the Russians, the "people of the Central Kingdom" (dulimba-i gurun , Zhongguo) were like the Torghuts; "people of the Central Kingdom" meant Manchus.

It was possible for Han Bannermen and Han bondservants (booi) to become Manchu by being transferred into the upper three Manchu Banners and having their surname "Manchufied" with the addition of a "giya" as a suffix. The process was called taiqi in Chinese. It typically occurred in cases of intermarriage with the Aisin-Gioro clan (the imperial clan); close relatives (fathers and brothers) of the concubine or Empress would get promoted from the Han Banner to the Manchu Banner and become Manchu.

Modern times 

The majority of the hundreds of thousands of people living in inner Beijing during the Qing were Manchus and Mongol bannermen from the Eight Banners after they were moved there in 1644, since Han Chinese were expelled and not allowed to re-enter the inner part of the city. Only after the "Hundred Days Reform",  during the reign of emperor Guangxu, were Han were allowed to re-enter inner Beijing.

Many Manchu Bannermen in Beijing supported the Boxers in the Boxer Rebellion and shared their anti-foreign sentiment. The Manchu Bannermen were devastated by the fighting during the First Sino-Japanese War and the Boxer Rebellion, sustaining massive casualties during the wars and subsequently being driven into extreme suffering and hardship. Much of the fighting in the Boxer Rebellion against the foreigners in defense of Beijing and Manchuria was done by Manchu Banner armies, which were destroyed while resisting the invasion. The German Minister Clemens von Ketteler was assassinated by a Manchu. Thousands of Manchus fled south from Aigun during the fighting in the Boxer Rebellion in 1900, their cattle and horses then stolen by Russian Cossacks who razed their villages and homes. The clan system of the Manchus in Aigun was obliterated by the despoliation of the area at the hands of the Russian invaders.

Manchu banner garrisons were annihilated on 5 roads by Russians as they suffered most of the casualties. Manchu Shoufu killed himself during the battle of Peking and the Manchu Lao She's father was killed by western soldiers in the battle as the Manchu banner armies of the Center Division of the Guards Army, Tiger Spirit Division and Peking Field Force in the Metropolitan banners were slaughtered by the western soldiers. Baron von Ketteler, the German diplomat was murdered by Captain Enhai, a Manchu from the Tiger Spirit Division of Aisin Gioro Zaiyi, Prince Duan and the Inner city Legation Quarters and Catholic cathedral (Church of the Saviour, Beijing) were both attacked by Manchu bannermen. Manchu bannermen were slaughtered by the Eight Nation Alliance all over Manchuria and Beijing because most of the Manchu bannermen supported the Boxers in the Boxer rebellion. There were 1,266 households including 900 Daurs and 4,500 Manchus in Sixty-Four Villages East of the River and Blagoveshchensk until the Blagoveshchensk massacre and Sixty-Four Villages East of the River massacre committed by Russian Cossack soldiers. Many Manchu villages were burned by Cossacks in the massacre according to Victor Zatsepine. Western and Japanese soldiers mass raped Manchu women and Mongol banner women in the Tartar Banner inner city of Beijing in siheyuan hutongs in the city. Sawara Tokusuke, a Japanese journalist wrote in  "Miscellaneous Notes about the Boxers," about the rapes of Manchu and Mongol banner girls like when Manchu bannerman Yulu 裕禄 of the Hitara clan was killed in Yangcun and his seven daughters gang raped in the Heavenly palace. A daughter and wife of Mongol banner noble Chongqi 崇绮 of the Alute clan were gang raped. Multiple relatives including his son Baochu killed themselves after he killed himself on 26 August 1900. (Fang 75).

Manchu royals, officials and officers like Yuxian, Qixiu 啟秀, Zaixun, Prince Zhuang and Captain Enhai (En Hai) were executed or forced to commit suicide by the Eight Nation Alliance. Manchu official Gangyi's 剛毅 execution was demanded but he already died. Japanese soldiers arrested Qixiu before he was executed. Zaixun, Prince Zhuang was forced to commit suicide on 21 February 1901. They executed Yuxian on 22 February 1901.
On 31 December 1900 German soldiers beheaded the Manchu captain Enhai for killing Clemens von Ketteler. Posthumous dishonour was conferred upon Gangyi.

By the 19th century, most Manchus in the city garrison spoke only Mandarin Chinese, not Manchu, which still distinguished them from their Han neighbors in southern China, who spoke non-Mandarin dialects. That they spoke Beijing dialect made recognizing Manchus folks relatively easy. It was northern Standard Chinese which the Manchu Bannermen spoke instead of the local dialect the Han people around the garrison spoke, so that Manchus in the garrisons at Jingzhou and Guangzhou both spoke Beijing Mandarin even though Cantonese was spoken at Guangzhou, and the Beijing dialect of Mandarin distinguished the Manchu bannermen at the Xi'an garrison from the local Han people who spoke the Xi'an dialect of Mandarin. Many Bannermen got jobs as teachers, writing textbooks for learning Mandarin and instructing people in Mandarin. In Guangdong, the Manchu Mandarin teacher Sun Yizun advised that the Yinyun Chanwei and Kangxi Zidian, dictionaries issued by the Qing government, were the correct guides to Mandarin pronunciation, rather than the pronunciation of the Beijing and Nanjing dialects.

In the late 19th century and early 1900s, intermarriage between Manchus and Han bannermen in the northeast increased as Manchu families were more willing to marry their daughters to sons from well off Han families to trade their ethnic status for higher financial status.

The Han Chinese Li Guojie, the grandson of Li Hongzhang, married the Manchu daughter of Natong, the Grand Secretary. Most intermarriage consisted of Han Bannermen marrying Manchus in areas like Aihun. Han Chinese Bannermen wedded Manchus and there was no law against this. Two of the Han Chinese General Yuan Shikai's sons married Manchu women, his sons Yuan Kequan 克權 marrying one of Manchu official Duanfang's daughters and Yuan Kexiang 克相 marrying one of Manchu official Natong's daughters, and one his daughters married a Manchu man, Yuan Fuzhen 複禎 marrying one of Manchu official Yinchang's sons.

As the end of the Qing dynasty approached, Manchus were portrayed as outside colonizers by Chinese nationalists such as Sun Yat-sen, even though the Republican revolution he brought about was supported by many reform-minded Manchu officials and military officers. This portrayal dissipated somewhat after the 1911 revolution as the new Republic of China now sought to include Manchus within its national identity. In order to blend in, some Manchus switched to speaking the local dialect instead of Standard Chinese.

By the early years of the Republic of China, very few areas of China still had traditional Manchu populations. Among the few regions where such comparatively traditional communities could be found, and where the Manchu language was still widely spoken, were the Aigun District and the Qiqihar District of Heilongjiang Province.

Until 1924, the Chinese government continued to pay stipends to Manchu bannermen, but many cut their links with their banners and took on Han-style names to avoid persecution. The official total of Manchus fell by more than half during this period, as they refused to admit their ethnicity when asked by government officials or other outsiders. On the other hand, in warlord Zhang Zuolin's reign in Manchuria, much better treatment was reported. There was no particular persecution of Manchus. Even the mausoleums of Qing emperors were still allowed to be managed by Manchu guardsmen, as in the past. Many Manchus joined the Fengtian clique, such as Xi Qia, a member of the Qing dynasty's imperial clan.

As a follow-up to the Mukden Incident, Manchukuo, a puppet state in Manchuria, was created by the Empire of Japan which was nominally ruled by the deposed Last Emperor, Puyi, in 1932. Although the nation's name implied a primarily Manchu affiliation, it was actually a completely new country for all the ethnicities in Manchuria, which had a majority Han population and was opposed by many Manchus as well as people of other ethnicities who fought against Japan in the Second Sino-Japanese War. The Japanese Ueda Kyōsuke labeled all 30 million people in Manchuria "Manchus", including Han Chinese, even though most of them were not ethnic Manchu, and the Japanese-written "Great Manchukuo" built upon Ueda's argument to claim that all 30 million "Manchus" in Manchukuo had the right to independence to justify splitting Manchukuo from China. In 1942, the Japanese-written "Ten Year History of the Construction of Manchukuo" attempted to emphasize the right of ethnic Japanese to the land of Manchukuo while attempting to delegitimize the Manchus' claim to Manchukuo as their native land, noting that most Manchus moved out during the Qing dynasty and only returned later.

In 1952, after the failure of both Manchukuo and the Nationalist Government (KMT), the newborn People's Republic of China officially recognized the Manchu as one of the ethnic minorities as Mao Zedong had criticized the Han chauvinism that dominated the KMT. In the 1953 census, 2.5 million people identified themselves as Manchu. The Communist government also attempted to improve the treatment of Manchu people; some Manchu people who had hidden their ancestry during the period of KMT rule became willing to reveal their ancestry, such as the writer Lao She, who began to include Manchu characters in his fictional works in the 1950s. Between 1982 and 1990, the official count of Manchu people more than doubled from 4,299,159 to 9,821,180, making them China's fastest-growing ethnic minority, but this growth was only on paper, as this was due to people formerly registered as Han applying for official recognition as Manchu. Since the 1980s, thirteen Manchu autonomous counties have been created in Liaoning, Jilin, Hebei, and Heilongjiang.

The Eight Banners system is one of the most important ethnic identity of today's Manchu people. So nowadays, Manchus are more like an ethnic coalition which not only contains the descendants of Manchu bannermen, also has a large number of Manchu-assimilated Chinese and Mongol bannermen. However, Solon and Sibe Bannermen who were considered as part of Eight Banner system under the Qing dynasty were registered as independent ethnic groups by the PRC government as Daur, Evenk, Nanai, Oroqen, and Sibe.

Since the 1980s, the reform after Cultural Revolution, there has been a renaissance of Manchu culture and language among the government, scholars and social activities with remarkable achievements. It was also reported that the resurgence of interest also spread among Han Chinese. In modern China, Manchu culture and language preservation is promoted by the Chinese Communist Party, and Manchus once again form one of the most socioeconomically advanced minorities within China. Manchus generally face little to no discrimination in their daily lives, there is however, a remaining anti-Manchu sentiment amongst Han nationalists conspiracy theorists. It is particularly common with participants of the Hanfu movement who subscribe to conspiracy theories about Manchu people, such as the Chinese Communist Party being occupied by Manchu elites hence the better treatment Manchus receive under the People's Republic of China in contrast to their persecution under the KMT's Republic of China rule.

Population

Mainland China 
Most Manchu people now live in Mainland China with a population of 10,410,585, which is 9.28% of ethnic minorities and 0.77% of China's total population. Among the provincial regions, there are two provinces, Liaoning and Hebei, which have over 1,000,000 Manchu residents. Liaoning has 5,336,895 Manchu residents which is 51.26% of Manchu population and 12.20% provincial population; Hebei has 2,118,711 which is 20.35% of Manchu people and 70.80% of provincial ethnic minorites. Manchus are the largest ethnic minority in Liaoning, Hebei, Heilongjiang and Beijing; 2nd largest in Jilin, Inner Mongolia, Tianjin, Ningxia, Shaanxi and Shanxi and 3rd largest in Henan, Shandong and Anhui.

Distribution

Manchu autonomous regions

Other areas

Manchu people can be found living outside mainland China. There are approximately 12,000 Manchus now in Taiwan. Most of them moved to Taiwan with the ROC government in 1949. One notable example was Puru, a famous painter, calligrapher and also the founder of the Manchu Association of Republic of China.

Culture

Influence on other Tungusic peoples

The Manchus implemented measures to "Manchufy" the other Tungusic peoples living around the Amur River basin. The southern Tungusic Manchus influenced the northern Tungusic peoples linguistically, culturally, and religiously.

Language and alphabet

Language

The Manchu language is a Tungusic language and has many dialects. Its standard form is called "Standard Manchu". It originates from the accent of Jianzhou Jurchens and was officially standardized during the Qianlong Emperor's reign. During the Qing dynasty, Manchus at the imperial court were required to speak Standard Manchu or face the emperor's reprimand. This applied equally to the palace presbyter for shamanic rites when performing sacrifice.

After the 19th century, most Manchus had perfected Standard Chinese and the number of Manchu speakers was dwindling. Although the Qing emperors emphasized the importance of the Manchu language again and again, the tide could not be turned.  After the Qing dynasty collapsed, the Manchu language lost its status as a national language and its official use in education ended. Manchus today generally speak Standard Chinese. The remaining skilled native Manchu speakers number less than 100, most of whom are to be found in Sanjiazi, Heilongjiang Province. Since the 1980s, there has been a resurgence of the Manchu language among the government, scholars and social activities. In recent years, with the help of the governments in Liaoning, Jilin and Heilongjiang, many schools started to have Manchu classes. There are also Manchu volunteers in many places of China who freely teach Manchu in the desire to rescue the language. Thousands of non-Manchus have learned the language through these platforms.

Today, in an effort to save Manchu culture from extinction, the older generation of Manchus are spending their own money and time to teach young people. In an effort to encourage learners, these classes were oftentimes free. They teach through the Internet and even mail Manchu textbooks for free, all for the purpose of protecting the national cultural traditions.

Alphabet

The Jurchens, ancestors of the Manchus, had created Jurchen script in the Jin dynasty. After the Jin dynasty collapsed, the Jurchen script was gradually lost. In the Ming dynasty, 60%–70% of Jurchens used Mongolian script to write letters and 30%–40% of Jurchens used Chinese characters. This persisted until Nurhaci revolted against the Ming Empire. Nurhaci considered it a major impediment that his people lacked a script of their own, so he commanded his scholars, Gagai and Eldeni, to create Manchu characters by reference to Mongolian scripts. They dutifully complied with the Khan's order and created Manchu script, which is called "script without dots and circles" or "old Manchu script". Due to its hurried creation, the script has its defects. Some vowels and consonants were difficult to distinguish. Shortly afterwards, their successor Dahai used dots and circles to distinguish vowels, aspirated and non-aspirated consonants and thus completed the script. His achievement is called "script with dots and circles" or "new Manchu script".

Traditional lifestyle
The Manchu are often mistakenly labelled a nomadic people, but they were sedentary agricultural people who lived in fixed villages, farmed crops and practiced hunting and mounted archery.

The southern Tungusic Manchu farming sedentary lifestyle was very different from the nomadic hunter gatherer forager lifestyle of their more northern Tungusic relatives like the Warka, which caused the Qing state to attempt to sedentarize them and adopt the farming lifestyle of the Manchus.

Women
In their traditional culture before the Qing, Manchu women originally had sex autonomy being able to have premarital sex, being able to talk and mingle with men after being married without coming under suspicion of infidelity and to remarry after becoming widows, but Manchu men later adopted Han Chinese Confucian values and started killing their wives and daughters during the Qing for perceived infidelity due to talking to unrelated men while married or premarital sex, and prizing virginity and widow chastity like Han Chinese. Compared to Han Chinese women, upper class Manchu women in the early Qing were at ease when talking to men.

Names and naming practices

Family names

The history of Manchu family names is quite long. Fundamentally, it succeeds the Jurchen family name of the Jin dynasty. However, after the Mongols extinguished the Jin dynasty, the Manchus started to adopt Mongol culture, including their custom of using only their given name until the end of the Qing dynasty, a practice confounding non-Manchus, leading them to conclude, erroneously, that they simply do not have family names.

A Manchu family name usually has two portions: the first is "Mukūn" (Abkai: Mukvn) which literally means "branch name"; the second, "Hala", represents the name of a person's clan. According to the Book of the Eight Manchu Banners' Surname-Clans, there are 1,114 Manchu family names. Gūwalgiya, Niohuru, Hešeri, Šumulu, Tatara, Gioro, Nara are considered as "famous clans" among Manchus.

There were stories of Han migrating to the Jurchens and assimilating into Manchu Jurchen society and Nikan Wailan may have been an example of this. The Manchu Cuigiya clan claimed that a Han Chinese founded their clan. The Tohoro clan (Duanfang's clan) claimed Han Chinese origin.

Given names

Manchus given names are distinctive. Generally, there are several forms, such as bearing suffixes "-ngga", "-ngge" or "-nggo", meaning "having the quality of"; bearing Mongol style suffixes "-tai" or "-tu", meaning "having"; bearing the suffix, "-ju", "-boo"; numerals or animal names.

Some ethnic names can also be a given name of the Manchus. One of the common first name for the Manchus is Nikan, which is also a Manchu exonym for the Han Chinese. For example, Nikan Wailan was a Jurchen leader who was an enemy of Nurhaci. Nikan was also the name of one of the Aisin-Gioro princes and grandsons of Nurhaci who supported Prince Dorgon. Nurhaci's first son was Cuyen, one of whose sons was Nikan.

Current status 
Nowadays, Manchus primarily use Chinese family and given names, but some still use a Manchu family name and Chinese given name, a Chinese family name and Manchu given name or both Manchu family and given names.

Burial customs 
The Jurchens and their Manchu descendants originally practiced cremation as part of their culture. They adopted the practice of burial from the Han Chinese, but many Manchus continued to cremate their dead. Princes were cremated on pyres.

Traditional hairstyle 

The traditional hairstyle for Manchu men is shaving the front of their heads while growing the hair on the back of their heads into a single braid called a queue, which was known as soncoho in Manchu. During the Qing Dynasty, the queue was legally mandated for male Han Chinese subjects in the Qing Empire, on the pain of death.

Manchu women wore their hair in a distinctive hairstyle called liangbatou.

Traditional garments

A common misconception among Han Chinese was that Manchu clothing was entirely separate from Hanfu. In fact, Manchu clothes were simply modified Ming Hanfu but the Manchus promoted the misconception that their clothing was of different origin. Manchus originally did not have their own cloth or textiles and the Manchus had to obtain Ming dragon robes and cloth when they paid tribute to the Ming dynasty or traded with the Ming. These Ming robes were modified, cut and tailored to be narrow at the sleeves and waist with slits in the skirt to make it suitable for falconry, horse riding and archery. The Ming robes were simply modified and changed by Manchus by cutting it at the sleeves and waist to make them narrow around the arms and waist instead of wide and added a new narrow cuff to the sleeves. The new cuff was made out of fur. The robe's jacket waist had a new strip of scrap cloth put on the waist while the waist was made snug by pleating the top of the skirt on the robe. The Manchus added sable fur skirts, cuffs and collars to Ming dragon robes and trimming sable fur all over them before wearing them. Han Chinese court costume was modified by Manchus by adding a ceremonial big collar (da-ling) or shawl collar (pijian-ling). It was mistakenly thought that the hunting ancestors of the Manchus skin clothes became Qing dynasty clothing, due to the contrast between Ming dynasty clothes unshaped cloth's straight length contrasting to the odd-shaped pieces of Qing dynasty long pao and chao fu. Scholars from the west wrongly thought they were purely Manchu. Chao fu robes from Ming dynasty tombs like the Wanli emperor's tomb were excavated and it was found that Qing chao fu was similar and derived from it. They had embroidered or woven dragons on them but are different from long pao dragon robes which are a separate clothing. Flaired skirt with right side fastenings and fitted bodices dragon robes have been found in Beijing, Shanxi, Jiangxi, Jiangsu and Shandong tombs of Ming officials and Ming imperial family members. Integral upper sleeves of Ming chao fu had two pieces of cloth attached on Qing chao fu just like earlier Ming chao fu that had sleeve extensions with another piece of cloth attached to the bodice's integral upper sleeve. Another type of separate Qing clothing, the long pao resembles Yuan dynasty clothing like robes found in the Shandong tomb of Li Youan during the Yuan dynasty. The Qing dynasty chao fu appear in official formal portraits while Ming dynasty Chao fu that they derive from do not, perhaps indicating the Ming officials and imperial family wore chao fu under their formal robes since they appear in Ming tombs but not portraits. Qing long pao were similar unofficial clothing during the Qing dynasty. The Yuan robes had hems flared and around the arms and torso they were tight. Qing unofficial clothes, long pao, derived from Yuan dynasty clothing while Qing official clothing, chao fu, derived from unofficial Ming dynasty clothing, dragon robes. The Ming consciously modeled their clothing after that of earlier Han Chinese dynasties like the Song dynasty, Tang dynasty and Han dynasty. In Japan's Nara city, the Todaiji temple's Shosoin repository has 30 short coats (hanpi) from Tang dynasty China. Ming dragon robes derive from these Tang dynasty hanpi in construction. The hanpi skirt and bodice are made of different cloth with different patterns on them and this is where the Qing chao fu originated. Cross-over closures are present in both the hanpi and Ming garments. The eighth century Shosoin hanpi's variety show it was in vogue at the tine and most likely derived from much more ancient clothing. Han dynasty and Jin dynasty (266–420) era tombs in Yingban, to the Tianshan mountains south in Xinjiang have clothes resembling the Qing long pao and Tang dynasty hanpi. The evidence from excavated tombs indicates that China had a long tradition of garments that led to the Qing chao fu and it was not invented or introduced by Manchus in the Qing dynasty or Mongols in the Yuan dynasty. The Ming robes that the Qing chao fu derived from were just not used in portraits and official paintings but were deemed as high status to be buried in tombs. In some cases the Qing went further than the Ming dynasty in imitating ancient China to display legitimacy with resurrecting ancient Chinese rituals to claim the Mandate of Heaven after studying Chinese classics. Qing sacrificial ritual vessels deliberately resemble ancient Chinese ones even more than Ming vessels. Tungusic people on the Amur river like Udeghe, Ulchi and Nanai adopted Chinese influences in their religion and clothing with Chinese dragons on ceremonial robes, scroll and spiral bird and monster mask designs, Chinese New Year, using silk and cotton, iron cooking pots, and heated house from China during the Ming dynasty.

The Spencer Museum of Art has six long pao robes that belonged to Han Chinese nobility of the Qing dynasty (Chinese nobility). Ranked officials and Han Chinese nobles had two slits in the skirts while Manchu nobles and the Imperial family had 4 slits in skirts. All first, second and third rank officials as well as Han Chinese and Manchu nobles were entitled to wear 9 dragons by the Qing Illustrated Precedents. Qing sumptuary laws only allowed four clawed dragons for officials, Han Chinese nobles and Manchu nobles while the Qing Imperial family, emperor and princes up to the second degree and their female family members were entitled to wear five clawed dragons. However officials violated these laws all the time and wore 5 clawed dragons and the Spencer Museum's 6 long pao worn by Han Chinese nobles have 5 clawed dragons on them.

The early phase of Manchu clothing succeeded from Jurchen tradition. White was the dominating color.To facilitate convenience during archery, the robe is the most common article of clothing for the Manchu people. Over the robe, a surcoat is usually worn, derived from the military uniform of Eight Banners army. During the Kangxi period, the surcoat gained popularity among commoners. The modern Chinese suits, the Cheongsam and Tangzhuang, are derived from the Manchu robe and surcoat which are commonly considered as "Chinese elements".

Wearing hats is also a part of traditional Manchu culture, and Manchu people wear hats in all ages and seasons in contrast to the Han Chinese culture of "Starting to wear hats at 20-year-old". Manchu hats are either formal or casual, formal hats being made in two different styles, straw for spring and summer, and fur for fall and winter. Casual hats are more commonly known as "Mandarin hats" in English.

Manchus have many distinctive traditional accessories. Women traditionally wear three earrings on each ear, a tradition that is maintained by many older Manchu women. Males also traditionally wear piercings, but they tend to only have one earring in their youth and do not continue to wear it as adults. The Manchu people also have traditional jewelry which evokes their past as hunters. The fergetun, a thumb ring traditionally made out of reindeer bone, was worn to protect the thumbs of archers. After the establishment of the Qing dynasty in 1644, the fergetun gradually became simply a form of jewelry, with the most valuable ones made in jade and ivory. High-heeled shoes were worn by Manchu women.

Traditional activities

Riding and archery

Riding and archery are significant to the Manchus. They were well-trained horsemen from their teenage years. Huangtaiji said, "Riding and archery are the most important martial arts of our country". Every generation of the Qing dynasty treasured riding and archery the most. Every spring and fall, from ordinary Manchus to aristocrats, all had to take riding and archery tests. Their test results could even affect their rank in the nobility. The Manchus of the early Qing dynasty had excellent shooting skills and their arrows were reputed to be capable of penetrating two persons.

From the middle period of the Qing dynasty, archery became more a form of entertainment in the form of games such as hunting swans, shooting fabric or silk target. The most difficult is shooting a candle hanging in the air at night. Gambling was banned in the Qing dynasty but there was no limitation on Manchus engaging in archery contests. It was common to see Manchus putting signs in front of their houses to invite challenges. After the Qianlong period, Manchus gradually neglected the practices of riding and archery, even though their rulers tried their best to encourage Manchus to continue their riding and archery traditions, but the traditions are still kept among some Manchus even nowadays.

Manchu wrestling 

Manchu wrestling is also an important martial art of the Manchu people. Buku, meaning "wrestling" or "man of unusual strength" in Manchu, was originally from a Mongolian word, "bökh". The history of Manchu wrestling can be traced back to Jurchen wrestling in the Jin dynasty which was originally from Khitan wrestling; it was very similar to Mongolian wrestling. In the Yuan dynasty, the Jurchens who lived in northeast China adopted Mongol culture including wrestling, bökh. In the latter Jin and early Qing period, rulers encouraged the populace, including aristocrats, to practise buku as a feature of military training. At the time, Mongol wrestlers were the most famous and powerful. By the Chongde period, Manchus had developed their own well-trained wrestlers and, a century later, in the Qianlong period, they surpassed Mongol wrestlers. The Qing court established the "Shan Pu Battalion" and chose 200 fine wrestlers divided into three levels. Manchu wrestling moves can be found in today's Chinese wrestling, shuai jiao, which is its most important part. Among many branches, Beijing wrestling adopted most Manchu wrestling moves.

Falconry 
As a result of their hunting ancestry, Manchus are traditionally interested in falconry. Gyrfalcon is the most highly valued discipline in the Manchu falconry social circle. In the Qing period, giving a gyrfalcon to the royal court in tribute could be met with a considerable reward. There were professional falconers in Ningguta area (today's Heilongjiang province and the northern part of Jilin province). It was a big base of falconry. Beijing's Manchus also like falconry. Compared to the falconry of Manchuria, it is more like an entertainment. Imperial Household Department of Beijing had professional falconers, too. They provided outstanding falcons to the emperor when he went to hunt every fall. Even today, Manchu traditional falconry is well practised in some regions.

Ice skating 

Ice skating is another Manchu pastime. The Qianlong Emperor called it a "national custom". It was one of the most important winter events of the Qing royal household, performed by the "Eight Banner Ice Skating Battalion" which was a special force trained to do battle on icy terrain. The battalion consisted of 1600 soldiers. In the Jiaqing period, it was reduced to 500 soldiers and transferred to the Jing Jie Battalion originally, literally meaning "chosen agile battalion".

In the 1930s–1940s, there was a famous Manchu skater in Beijing whose name was Wu Tongxuan, from the Uya clan and one of the royal household skaters in Empress Dowager Cixi's regency. He frequently appeared in many of Beijing's skating rinks. Nowadays, there are still Manchu figure skaters; world champions Zhao Hongbo and Tong Jian are the pre-eminent examples.

Literature 
The Tale of the Nisan Shaman is the most important piece of Manchu literature. It primarily recounts how Nisan Shaman helps revive a young hunter. The story also spread to Xibe, Nanai, Daur, Oroqen, Evenk and other Tungusic peoples. It has four versions: the handwriting version from Qiqihar; two different handwriting versions from Aigun; and the one by the Manchu writer Dekdengge in Vladivostok. The four versions are similar, but Haišenwei's is the most complete. It has been translated into Russian, Chinese, English and other languages.

Folk art

Octagonal drum

Octagonal drum is a type of Manchu folk art that was very popular among bannermen, especially in Beijing. It is said that octagonal drum originated with the snare drum of the Eight-banner military and the melody was made by the banner soldiers who were on the way back home from victory in the battle of Jinchuan. The drum is composed of wood surrounded by bells. The drumhead is made by wyrmhide with tassels at the bottom. The colors of the tassels are yellow, white, red, and blue, which represent the four colors of the Eight Banners. When artists perform, they use their fingers to hit the drumhead and shake the drum to ring the bells. Traditionally, octagonal drum is performed by three people. One is the harpist; one is the clown who is responsible for harlequinade; and the third is the singer.

"Zidishu" is the main libretto of octagonal drum and can be traced back to a type of traditional folk music called the "Manchu Rhythm". Although Zidishu was not created by Han Chinese, it still contains many themes from Chinese stories, such as Romance of the Three Kingdoms, Dream of the Red Chamber, Romance of the Western Chamber, Legend of the White Snake and Strange Stories from a Chinese Studio. Additionally, there are many works that depict the lives of Bannermen. Aisin-Gioro Yigeng, who was pen named "Helü" and wrote the sigh of old imperial bodyguard, as the representative author. Zidishu involves two acts of singing, which are called dongcheng and xicheng.

After the fall of the Qing dynasty, the influence of the octagonal drum gradually reduced. Many famous Chinese monochord performers and crosstalkers were the artists of octagonal drum, such as De Shoushan and Zhang Sanlu.

Ulabun 
Ulabun is a form of Manchu storytelling entertainment which is performed in the Manchu language. Different from octagonal drum, ulabun is popular among the Manchu people living in Manchuria. It has two main categories; one is popular folk literature such as the Tale of the Nisan Shaman, the other is from folk music with an informative and independent plot, and complete structure. Song Xidong aka. Akšan/Akxan is a famous artist in performing ulabun.

Religion 
Originally, Manchus, and their predecessors, were principally Buddhists with Shamanist influences. Every Manchu King started his royal title with Buddha. After the conquest of China in the 17th century, Manchus came into contact with Chinese culture. They adopted Confucianism along with Buddhism and discouraged shamanism.

Manchu shamanism 

Shamanism has a long history in Manchu civilization and influenced them tremendously over thousands of years. John Keay states in A History of China, shaman is the single loan-word from Manchurian into the English language. After the conquest of China in the 17th century, although Manchus officially adopted Buddhism and widely adopted Chinese folk religion, Shamanic traditions can still be found in the aspects of soul worship, totem worship, belief in nightmares and apotheosis of philanthropists. Apart from the Shamanic shrines in the Qing palace, no temples erected for worship of Manchu gods could be found in Beijing. Thus, the story of competition between Shamanists and Lamaists was often heard in Manchuria but the Manchu emperors helped Lamaists or Tibetan Buddhists officially.

Buddhism 
Jurchens, the predecessors of the Manchus adopted the Buddhism of Balhae, Goryeo, Liao and Song in the 10–13th centuries, so it was not something new to the rising Manchus in the 16–17th centuries. Qing emperors were always entitled "Buddha". They were regarded as Mañjuśrī in Tibetan Buddhism and had high attainments.

Hong Taiji who was of Mongolian descent started leaning towards Chan Buddhism, which became Zen Buddhism. Still, Huangtaiji patronized Tibetan Buddhism extensively and publicly. Huangtaiji patronized Buddhism but sometimes felt Tibetan Buddhism to be inferior to Chan Buddhism.

The Qianlong Emperor's faith in Tibetan Buddhism has been questioned in recent times because the emperor indicated that he supported the Yellow Church (the Tibetan Buddhist Gelukpa sect)

This explanation of only supporting the "Yellow Hats" Tibetan Buddhists for practical reasons was used to deflect Han criticism of this policy by the Qianlong Emperor, who had the "Lama Shuo" stele engraved in Tibetan, Mongol, Manchu and Chinese, which said: "By patronizing the Yellow Church we maintain peace among the Mongols." It seems he was wary of the rising power of the Tibetan Kingdom and its influence over the Mongolians and Manchu public, princes and generals.

Chinese folk religion 
Manchus were affected by Chinese folk religions for most of the Qing dynasty. Save for ancestor worship, the gods they consecrated were virtually identical to those of the Han Chinese. Guan Yu worship is a typical example. He was considered as the God Protector of the Nation and was sincerely worshipped by Manchus. They called him "Lord Guan". Uttering his name was taboo. In addition, Manchus worshipped Cai Shen and the Kitchen God just as the Han Chinese did. The worship of Mongolian and Tibetan gods has also been reported.

Roman Catholic 
Influenced by the Jesuit missionaries in China, there were also a considerable number of Manchu Catholics during the Qing dynasty. The earliest Manchu Catholics appeared in the 1650s. In the Yongzheng eras, Depei, the Hošo Jiyan Prince, was a Catholic whose baptismal name was "Joseph". His wife was also baptised and named "Maria". At the same time, the sons of Doro Beile Sunu were devout Catholics, too. In the Jiaqing period, Tong Hengšan and Tong Lan were Catholic Manchu Bannermen. These Manchu Catholics were proselytized and persecuted by Qing emperors but they steadfastly refused to renounce their faith. There were Manchu Catholics in modern times, too, such as Ying Lianzhi, the founder of Fu Jen Catholic University.

Traditional holidays 
Manchus have many traditional holidays. Some are derived from Chinese culture, such as the "Spring Festival" and Duanwu Festival. Some are of Manchu origin. Food Exhaustion Day, on every 26th day of the 8th month of the lunar calendar, is another example which was inspired by a story that once Nurhaci and his troops were in a battle with enemies and almost running out of food. The villagers who lived near the battlefield heard the emergency and came to help. There was no tableware on the battlefield. They had to use perilla leaves to wrap the rice. Afterwards, they won the battle. So later generations could remember this hardship, Nurhaci made this day the "Food Exhaustion Day". Traditionally on this day, Manchu people eat perilla or cabbage wraps with rice, scrambled eggs, beef or pork. Banjin Inenggi, on the 13th day of the tenth month of the lunar calendar, which started to be celebrated in late 20th century, is the anniversary of the name creation of Manchu. This day in 1635, Hong Taiji changed the ethnic name from Jurchen to Manchu.

See also 

 Manchu language and alphabet
 Manchu name and clans
 Manchuria
 Manchukuo
 Qing dynasty and emperors
 Eight Banners and their identity
 Tungusic peoples
 Sushen
 Mohe
 Jurchen
 Sinicization of the Manchus
 Military of the Qing dynasty

Notes 
1. Also known as Man, Bannermen, or Banner people. They are sometimes called 'red-tasseled Manchus", a reference to the ornamentation on traditional Manchu hats.
2.Fengcheng an d Beizhen are cities but treated as Manchu autonomous counties.
3. Möngke Temür, Qing dynasty emperors' ancestor
4. Cungšan was considered as Nurhaci's direct ancestor by some viewpoints, but disagreements also exist.
5. Aka. Manchu State
6. The meaning of "daicing" (daiqing) is debatable. It has been reported that the word was imported from Mongolian means "fighting country"
7. e.g. Nadanju (70 in Manchu), Susai (5 in Manchu), Liošici(67, a Mandarin homophone) and Bašinu(85, a Mandarin homophone)
8. e.g. Dorgon (badger) and Arsalan (lion)
9. e.g. , a famous Chinese calligrapher.
10. e.g. Ying Batu, Ying Bayan, the sons of a famous Manchu director, Ying Da.
11. e.g. Aisin-Gioro Ulhicun, a famous scholar of Khitan and Manchu linguistic studies.
12. less than 100 native speakers. Several thousands can speak Manchu as second language through primary education or free classes for adults in China.
13. Autonomous counties are shown in bright green. Counties with autonomous townships are in dark green, with the number of Manchu townshipin each county shown in red (or yellow). So are another 2 pictures.

References

Sources

In Chinese

In English

Further reading

External links 

 Manchu Association of Republic of China 
 Shenyang Manchu Federation (SYMZF) 

 
Tungusic peoples
Manchuria
Ethnic groups officially recognized by China